This list of universities and colleges in Portugal gives the Portuguese institutions providing higher education. Higher education in Portugal is organized into two systems: university and polytechnic. There are public and private higher education institutions.

Universities

Public universities

ISCTE - University Institute of Lisbon
University of the Azores
University of Algarve (includes polytechnic schools)
University of Aveiro (includes polytechnic schools)
University of Beira Interior
University of Coimbra
University of Évora (includes polytechnic schools)
University of Lisbon
University of Madeira (includes polytechnic schools)
University of Minho (includes polytechnic schools)
NOVA University of Lisbon
University of Porto
University of Trás-os-Montes and Alto Douro (includes polytechnic schools)

Public distance learning universities
Universidade Aberta

Private

Private universities

Autonomous University of Lisbon
Catholic University of Portugal (includes polytechnic schools)
European University of Lisbon
Fernando Pessoa University (Porto and Ponte de Lima) (includes polytechnic schools)
Lusíada University (Lisbon, Porto and Vila Nova de Famalicão)
Lusófona University (Lisbon and Porto) (includes polytechnic schools)
Portucalense Infante D. Henrique University (Porto)

Private institutes and schools

CESPU - Cooperativa de Ensino Superior Politécnico e Universitário (Gandra, Penafiel and Vila Nova de Famalicão) (includes polytechnic schools)
Escola Superior Artística do Porto
Escola Superior de Actividades Imobiliárias (Lisbon)
Escola Superior Gallaecia (Vila Nova de Cerveira)
Escola Universitária Vasco da Gama (Coimbra)
Instituto Superior de Ciências da Saúde Egas Moniz (Almada) (includes polytechnic schools)
Instituto Piaget (Almada, Silves, Vila Nova de Gaia and Viseu) (includes polytechnic schools)
Instituto Superior de Gestão
Instituto Superior Manuel Teixeira Gomes (Portimão)
Instituto Superior Miguel Torga (Coimbra)
Instituto Superior de Serviço Social do Porto
Instituto Superior da Maia
Instituto Superior de Gestão e Administração de Leiria
Instituto Universitário de Ciências Psicológicas, Sociais e da Vida (Lisbon)

Polytechnic institutes

Public polytechnic institutes and schools 

Polytechnic Institute of Beja
Polytechnic Institute of Bragança
Polytechnic Institute of Castelo Branco
Polytechnic Institute of Cávado and Ave
Polytechnic Institute of Coimbra
Polytechnic Institute of Guarda
Polytechnic Institute of Leiria
Polytechnic Institute of Lisboa
Polytechnic Institute of Portalegre
Polytechnic Institute of Porto
Polytechnic Institute of Santarém
Polytechnic Institute of Setúbal
Polytechnic Institute of Tomar
Polytechnic Institute of Viana do Castelo
Polytechnic Institute of Viseu
Escola Superior de Hotelaria e Turismo do Estoril
Escola Náutica Infante D. Henrique
Escola Superior de Enfermagem de Coimbra
Escola Superior de Enfermagem de Lisboa
Escola Superior de Enfermagem do Porto

Private polytechnic institutes and schools 

Academia Nacional Superior de Orquestra (Lisbon)
Atlântica - Escola Universitária de Ciências Empresariais (School of Management Sciences, Health, IT & Engineering) (Oeiras)
Escola Superior de Negócios Atlântico (Atlântico Business School) (Vila Nova de Gaia)
Conservatório Superior de Música de Gaia
Escola Superior de Artes e Design (Matosinhos)
Escola Superior Artística de Guimarães
Escola Superior de Educação de Almeida Garrett (Lisbon)
Escola Superior de Educação de João de Deus (Lisbon)
Escola Superior de Educação de Paula Frassinetti (Porto)
Escola Superior de Educadores de Infância Maria Ulrich (Lisbon)
Escola Superior de Saúde do Alcoitão (Alcoitão, Alcabideche)
Escola Superior de Saúde Atlântica (Oeiras)
Escola Superior de Saúde da Cruz Vermelha Portuguesa (Lisbon)
Escola Superior de Saúde de Santa Maria (Porto)
Escola Superior de Tecnologias e Artes de Lisboa
Instituto de Estudos Superiores de Fafe
Polytechnic Institute of Maia
Instituto Português de Administração de Marketing (Lisbon and Porto)
Instituto Superior de Administração e Gestão (Porto)
Instituto Superior de Administração e Línguas (Funchal)
Instituto Superior de Ciências da Administração (Lisbon)
Instituto Superior de Ciências Educativas (Lisbon and Penafiel)
Instituto Superior de Ciências Empresariais e do Turismo (Porto)
Instituto Superior de Ciências da Informação e da Administração (Aveiro)
Instituto Superior de Comunicação Empresarial (Lisbon School of Business Communication)
Instituto Superior D. Dinis (Marinha Grande)
Instituto Superior de Entre Douro e Vouga (Santa Maria da Feira)
Instituto Superior de Novas Profissões (Lisbon)
Instituto Superior de Paços de Brandão
Instituto Superior Politécnico Gaya (Vila Nova de Gaia)
Instituto Superior Politécnico do Oeste (Torres Vedras)
Instituto Superior de Tecnologias Avançadas de Lisboa (Lisbon and Porto)
ISAVE - Instituto Superior de Saúde (Amares)
Instituto Superior de Educação e Ciências (Lisbon)
ISLA - Instituto Politécnico de Gestão e Tecnologia (Vila Nova de Gaia)
ISLA - Instituto Superior de Gestão e Administração de Santarém
Escola Superior de Enfermagem Dr. José Timóteo Montalvão Machado (Chaves)
Escola Superior de Enfermagem São Francisco das Misericórdias (Lisbon)
Escola Superior de Enfermagem de São José de Cluny (Funchal)
Escola Superior de Saúde Norte da Cruz Vermelha Portuguesa (Oliveira de Azeméis)

Military and police higher education
Air Force Academy
Military Academy
Naval School
Instituto Superior de Ciências Policiais e Segurança Interna

See also 
Higher education in Portugal
List of colleges and universities
List of schools in Portugal

 
Universities and colleges
Portugal
Portugal
Universities and colleges